The Women's Home Missionary Society had joined with the Women's Missionary Society of the Pacific Coast in 1893.  Together they opened the "Oriental Home for Chinese Women and Girls" at 912 Washington Street in San Francisco's Chinatown in 1901.

The home was run by Kate Burton Lake as the matron of the rescue asylum and Margarita John Lake as the missionary.  Both were appointed to their positions in 1896. Both of the women worked tirelessly as a voice for immigrant Chinese women and children's rights.  They rescued women and girls from slavery, prostitution and overall horrible living conditions.  Kate and Margarita were both dismissed from the home for unknown reasons by February 1903.  The Oriental Home itself was destroyed by the 1906 San Francisco earthquake.

References
 Pacific Society for the Suppression of Vice Annual Report (1900)
 The San Francisco Examiner January 10, 1903

Chinese-American history
History of San Francisco
History of women in California
1893 establishments in California
Chinese-American culture in California
Chinatown, San Francisco